The American rap artist Eve has received a wide variety of music awards since 2000.

American Music Awards

|-
|2000
|style="text-align:center;" rowspan="2"|Herself
| Favorite Soul/R&B New Artist
|
|-
|2003
| Favorite Female Hip-Hop Artist
|
|}

ASCAP

ASCAP Pop Music Awards

|-
| style="text-align:center;"|2005
| style="text-align:center;"| "Rich Girl"
| style="text-align:center;"| Most Performed Songs
| 
|}

ASCAP Rhythm & Soul Awards

|-
| style="text-align:center;" rowspan="2"|2001
| style="text-align:center;" rowspan="2"|"Hot Boyz"
| style="text-align:center;"| R&B Award-Winning R&B/Hip-Hop Songs
| 
|-
| style="text-align:center;"| Top Rap Song
| 
|-
| style="text-align:center;"|2002
| style="text-align:center;"|"Let Me Blow Ya Mind
| style="text-align:center;"|R&B Award-Winning R&B/Hip-Hop Songs
|
|}

BET

BET Awards

|-
|2001
|style="text-align:center;" rowspan="3"|Herself 
|style="text-align:center;" rowspan="3"|Best Female Hip-Hop Artist
|
|-
|2013
|
|-
|2014
|
|}

Billboard Music Awards

|-
|2002
| style="text-align:center;"|"Let Me Blow Ya Mind"
| style="text-align:center;"| Best Rap/Hip-Hop Clip of the Year
|
|}

Black Reel Awards

|-
|2005
|Herself (for The Woodsman)
|Best Actress
|
|}

BMI

BMI Pop Awards

|-
|2004
| "Gangsta Lovin'"
| Award Winning Songs
| 
|}

Emmy Awards

Daytime Emmy Awards

|-
|2019
| The Talk
| Outstanding Entertainment Talk Show Host
| 
|-
|2020
| The Talk
| Outstanding Entertainment Talk Show Host
| 
|}

Grammy Awards

|-
| style="text-align:center;" rowspan="2"|2002
| style="text-align:center;"|"Let Me Blow Ya Mind" (Ft. Gwen Stefani) 
| style="text-align:center;"| Best Rap/Sung Collaboration
|
|-
| style="text-align:center;"|Scorpion 
| style="text-align:center;"| Best Rap Album 
|
|-
| style="text-align:center;"|2003
| style="text-align:center;"|"Satisfaction"
| style="text-align:center;"|Best Female Rap Solo Performance
| 
|-
| style="text-align:center;"|2006
| style="text-align:center;"|"Rich Girl" (with Gwen Stefani) 
| style="text-align:center;"|Best Rap/Sung Collaboration 
|
|-
| style="text-align:center;"|2022
| style="text-align:center;"|Planet Her (deluxe) (as featured artist)
| style="text-align:center;"|Album of the Year
|
|}

MCP Awards

|-
| style="text-align:center;" rowspan="3"|2013
| style="text-align:center;"|Lip Lock
| style="text-align:center;"|Incredible Album
|
|-
| style="text-align:center;"|Herself
| style="text-align:center;"|Major Indie
|
|-
| style="text-align:center;"|"Eve" ( ft. Miss. Kitty) 
| style="text-align:center;"|Comeback Kid 
|
|}

MTV

MTV Movie Awards

|-
|2003
|Herself (for Barbershop)
|Best Female Breakthrough Performance
|
|}

MTV Video Music Awards

|-
| style="text-align:center;"|2000
| style="text-align:center;"|"Love Is Blind"
| style="text-align:center;"|Best Rap Video
|
|-
| style="text-align:center;" rowspan="3"|2001
| style="text-align:center;" rowspan="3"|"Let Me Blow Ya Mind" (with Gwen Stefani)
| style="text-align:center;"|Best Female Video
|
|-
| style="text-align:center;"|Viewer's Choice
|
|-
| style="text-align:center;"|Best Hip-Hop Video
|
|-
| style="text-align:center;"|2007 
| style="text-align:center;"|"Tambourine"
| style="text-align:center;"|Best Choreography
|
|}

Much Music Video Awards

|-
|rowspan="2"| 2005 ||| "Rich Girl" || People's Choice: Favourite International Artist || 
|}

Nickelodeon Kids Choice Awards

|-
|| 2005  || rowspan="2"| Eve ||  rowspan="2"| Favorite Television Actress || 
|-
|| 2006 || 
|}

Soul Train

Soul Train Awards

|-
|rowspan="3"|2000 || "Gotta Man" ||Best New R&B/Soul or Rap Artist || 
|-
|rowspan="2"|  "Hot Boyz" ||  Best Music Video || 
|-
| Best R&B/Soul or Rap Music Video ||  
|}

Teen Choice Awards
The Teen Choice Awards is an awards show presented annually by the Fox Broadcasting Company. Eve has received four awards from six nominations.

|-
| 2001   || "Let Me Blow Ya Mind" || Choice R&B/Hip Hop Track || 
|-
| 2002  || "Gangsta Lovin'"|| Choice Hook Up || 
|-
|rowspan="2"| 2003  || Barbershop || Choice Female Break out Movie Star || 
|-
| Herself ||Choice Crossover Artist || 
|-
|rowspan="2"| 2004 || rowspan="2"| Eve || Choice Breakout TV Star|| 
|-
| Choice TV Actress||  
|-
|rowspan="5"| 2005  ||rowspan="4"| "Rich Girl" || Choice Breakout || 
|-
| Best Female Video || 
|-
| Visionary Award  || 
|-
| Choice Collaboration ||  
|-
| Eve  || Choice TV Actress || 
|}

VH1

My VH1 Music Awards

|-
|rowspan="2"| 2001 ||| "What's Going On" ||rowspan="2"| There's No "I" in Team (Best Collaboration) ||  
|-
|"Let Me Blow Ya Mind" || 
|}

VH1 Vogue Fashion Awards

|-
|| 2002 
| Herself
| Breakthrough Style Award
|
|}

References

Eve